Batang Benar is a small town in Seremban District, Negeri Sembilan, Malaysia. It is located near Negeri Sembilan-Selangor border. The nearest big town to Batang Benar is Nilai.

Transportation

Batang Benar is linked to Seremban via KTM Komuter Batang Benar Komuter station.

References

External links
  Minta khidmat ETS di stesen Batang Benar

Seremban District
Towns in Negeri Sembilan